Pizzo d'Orsalia is a mountain of the Swiss Lepontine Alps, overlooking Bosco/Gurin in the canton of Ticino. It lies on the chain that separates the Val Calnègia from the Valle di Bosco/Gurin.

References

External links
 Pizzo d'Orsalia on Hikr

Mountains of the Alps
Mountains of Switzerland
Mountains of Ticino
Lepontine Alps